Toronto Centre is a provincial electoral district in Toronto, Ontario, Canada. Since 1999 it has elected one member to the Legislative Assembly of Ontario.

It was created in 1999 as Toronto Centre—Rosedale from most of St. George—St. David and parts of St. Andrew—St. Patrick, Fort York, when ridings were redistributed to match their federal counterparts.

From 1999 to 2007 the riding included the area of Toronto from Avenue Road/University Avenue in the west to the Don River and the city limits in the east and the Mount Pleasant Cemetery and the CPR in the north.

In 2007, the riding was abolished and redistributed mostly into Toronto Centre. It lost the area west of Yonge Street and south of College Street plus Toronto Island to Trinity—Spadina. It also gained some parts of Toronto—Danforth as the riding's east border was altered to continue along the Don River past the former city limits to Pottery Road to Bayview Avenue to the CPR. Another boundary change altered the borders around the Rosehill Reservoir.

The Ontario Legislative Building was located within this district until the 2015 electoral redistribution.

Members of Provincial Parliament

Election results

2022 general election

2018 general election

The Liberal incumbent Glen Murray resigned his seat effective 1 September 2017 to accept a position with the Pembina Institute, and the seat remained vacant until this election. In April 2018, PC candidate Meredith Cartwright hired actors to pretend to be Doug Ford supporters at the first provincial leader's debate.

2014 general election

2011 general election

2010 by-election

On January 6, 2010, a provincial by-election was called in Toronto Centre to replace George Smitherman, who had resigned as MPP to run for mayor of Toronto.  The by-election took place on February 4, 2010.

2007 general election

2007 electoral reform referendum

2003 general election

1999 general election

References

Sources
Elections Ontario Past Election Results
Map of riding for 2018 election

External links

Provincial electoral districts of Toronto